Jacob Nilsson (born 12 October 1993) is a Swedish professional ice hockey centre currently playing for Frölunda HC in the Swedish Hockey League (SHL).

Playing career
Nilsson made his Swedish Hockey League (SHL) debut during the 2017–18 season, playing in 40 games for Mora IK. He made his SHL debut and recorded his first SHL goal on 19 October 2017 against Frölunda HC. On 25 February, Nilsson was fined 13,000 Swedish krona and suspended three games due to an altercation with Rögle BK player Linus Sandin. On 23 April, Nilsson was named to Sweden's National Team to compete at the 2018 Sweden Hockey Games, but was not selected for the 2018 IIHF World Championship. However, due to his success in the SHL and with the Swedish national team, Nilsson created interest from both the National Hockey League in North America and the Kontinental Hockey League.

On 31 May 2018, as a free agent, the Chicago Blackhawks of the National Hockey League signed Nilsson to a one-year contract. Nilsson then moved to North American to join the Blackhawks organization. While attending the Blackhawks training camp, Nilsson was assigned to their American Hockey League affiliate, the Rockford IceHogs, on 21 September. After playing 31 games for the IceHogs, and earning 14 points, Nilsson was called up to the NHL for the first time on 22 December. He made his NHL debut the following day in a 6–3 loss to the Florida Panthers.

On 19 April 2019, the Blackhawks signed Nilsson to a one-year contract extension. He was subsequently assigned to the Rockford IceHogs and named an assistant captain alongside Matthew Highmore and Tyler Sikura. In the 2019–20 season, Nilsson compiled 7 goals and 21 points in 62 regular season contests before the season was cancelled due to COVID-19.

As an impending restricted free agent with the Blackhawks, Nilsson opted to return to Sweden in agreeing to a two-year contract with Färjestad BK of the SHL on 26 April 2020.

Career statistics

References

External links

1993 births
Living people
Chicago Blackhawks players
Frölunda HC players
Färjestad BK players
Mora IK players
Rockford IceHogs (AHL) players
Swedish ice hockey centres
Ice hockey people from Stockholm
Tingsryds AIF players
Undrafted National Hockey League players